Osten is  a municipality in the district of Cuxhaven, in Lower Saxony, Germany.

Osten may also refer to:

Osten (surname)
Osten (Macedonian magazine), humor weekly
Östen, semi-legendary king of Sweden
Östen (name)

See also
Øystein, Norwegian given name
Østen, Scandinavian given name